The 1917 All-Ireland Senior Football Championship was the 31st staging of Ireland's premier Gaelic football knock-out competition. Wexford won the third title of their four-in-a-row.

Results

Connacht Senior Football Championship

Leinster Senior Football Championship

Munster Senior Football Championship

Ulster Senior Football Championship

An objection was made and a replay ordered.

All-Ireland Senior Football Championship

Championship statistics

Miscellaneous

 Clare win the Munster football title for the first time ever.
 Wexford become Leinster champions for the fifth year in a row and the second county after Dublin to win the All Ireland football title for the third year in a row.

References

All-Ireland Senior Football Championship